Buffy Jo Christina Wicks (born August 10, 1977) is an American politician who serves in the California State Assembly. A Democrat, she represents the 15th Assembly District, which includes the cities of Berkeley, Piedmont, Richmond, San Pablo, and El Cerrito in the East Bay. Prior to being elected to the State Assembly, she was an American political strategist who is credited as one of the architects of President Barack Obama's grassroots organizing model. She also served on the senior staff of Obama's 2008 and 2012 presidential campaigns, and as Deputy Director at the White House Office of Public Engagement.

Wicks was first elected to the State Assembly in November 2018 after beating Richmond City Councilmember Jovanka Beckles, a fellow Democrat.

Background 
Born in Foresthill, California in 1977, Wicks graduated from Placer High School in 1995. She graduated from the University of Washington in 1999 with a B.A. degree in political science and history.

In 2000, she began a two-year program for an International Master in Peace, Conflict, and Development Studies (PEACE Master) of the Universitat Jaume I (UJI), Castellón, Spain, under the UNESCO Chair of Philosophy for Peace, but left in 2001 and did not complete the degree.

Career 
Wicks has worked in the labor movement, on women's issues, and as a children's rights advocate.

Wicks's started her political career in the early 2000s in the San Francisco Bay Area by organizing rallies against the Iraq War. She then worked on the unsuccessful 2004 presidential campaign of Howard Dean.

As one of the early hires on the 2008 presidential campaign for Barack Obama, Wicks was active in grassroots mobilization and outcome-based organizing. She ran various state operations during the primaries and general election, including in California, Texas and Missouri.

Wicks was then tapped by President Obama to serve in the Executive Office of the President as the Deputy Director of the White House Office of Public Engagement.

From 2010 to 2011, Wicks "served as Rahm Emanuel’s campaign manager in early months of campaign and developed core strategy and positioning in race as well as early infrastructure."

In 2012, she joined President Obama's re-election effort and served as the National Director of Operation Vote. She was responsible for mobilizing voters in demographic groups including African American, Latino, women, and the youth.

From 2014 to 2015, Wicks transitioned the super PAC Priorities USA Action into a pro-Hillary Clinton vehicle and served as its executive director. In 2016, Wicks was named the California State director by Clinton's presidential campaign in advance of the June 7 primary.

Wicks previously worked as the political director of "Wake Up Wal-Mart", a United Food and Commercial Worker-funded movement. She was a fellow at Institute of Politics and Public Policy at Georgetown University and a senior fellow at the Center for American Progress focusing on public policies affecting women and families.

Wicks has published opinion editorials for Time, Politico, and the Daily Beast on current political events. She also gives regular speeches in the United States and abroad on organizing, leadership, women's issues, and the state of American politics.

California State Assembly race 
In 2017, Wicks declared herself a candidate for the 2018 California State Assembly election, running for the 15th district. The seat was vacated by Tony Thurmond, who ran for California State Superintendent of Public Instruction. Wicks's opponents in the race included Oakland City Councilman Dan Kalb and Richmond City Councilwoman Jovanka Beckles. In the primary held on June 5, Wicks finished first with 31.4% of the vote. In the general election on November 6, Wicks won with 54% of the vote to Beckles's 46%.

First State Assembly term 
On August 31, 2020 (the final day of the legislative session), Wicks, having been previously denied the right to vote by proxy, appeared on the floor of the State Assembly holding her crying newborn baby while speaking in favor of passing housing legislation. This incident earned Wicks international attention, sparking a discussion in the media on how she might use her newfound reputation to advocate for expanding family leave protections in the United States. Meena Harris, Hillary Clinton, and others took to social media to congratulate and encourage Wicks.

Second State Assembly term 
In her second term, Wicks served as Chair of the Assembly Committee on Housing and Community Development. On April 22, 2022, a convoy of anti-abortion truckers attempted to demonstrate in front of her house, but were driven away by egg-wielding children. Wicks was the author for several pieces of housing legislation including AB 2011.

Controversies 
Wicks sponsored an bill that would require all workers in California to be vaccinated with the Covid-19 vaccines. The Bill was "postponed" after the bill faced stiff opposition from labor unions as the Omicron variant crested in the heavily vaccinated state.

Anti-abortion commentators generated controversy when Wicks introduced AB 2223, a bill intended to protect women from criminal prosecutions for experiencing a miscarriage or inducing an abortion. Under the current law at the time, stillbirths after 20 weeks are considered "unattended deaths" and a coroner is required to investigate.  AB 2223 would have reclassified stillbirths such that they are no longer investigated as a matter of course, although it does not explicitly prevent stillbirths from being investigated. While the bill 'still allows authorities “to be able to investigate the facts of a newborn child’s death, including whether the child was born living and when and how the child died,”'
it was widely and falsely characterized by anti-abortion commentators as legalizing infanticide.

2018 California State Assembly election

2020 California State Assembly election

See also 
Barack Obama presidential campaign, 2008
Barack Obama presidential campaign, 2012
Hillary Clinton presidential campaign, 2016

References

External links 

 
Buffy Wicks on Twitter
 White House Office of Public Engagement and Intergovernmental Affairs
 Buffy Wicks on why Obama will win

1977 births
Democratic Party members of the California State Assembly
Barack Obama 2008 presidential campaign
Barack Obama 2012 presidential campaign
Living people
Obama administration personnel
Placer High School alumni
University of Washington alumni
Walmart
American political consultants
Women state legislators in California
United Food and Commercial Workers people
21st-century American politicians
21st-century American women politicians